Ralph J. (R.J.) Kaufmann was an American historian of English literature. He was a Stiles Professor Emeritus in Humanities and Comparative Literature, and a widely collected author.

References

21st-century American historians
21st-century American male writers
University of Texas at Austin faculty
20th-century American non-fiction writers
American male non-fiction writers
20th-century American male writers